This is a list of songs recorded by American alternative rock band Foo Fighters.

Released songs

Original compositions

Cover versions

Unreleased tracks

Live Songs

Covers

References 

 
Foo Fighters